The President of the Institute of Physics is the head of the governing Council of the Institute of Physics.  The history of the Institute, from its founding as the Physical Society of London in 1874 through to today's Institute has meant that the name of the post held has varied. The current President is Jonathan Flint.

Presidents of the Physical Society of London

1874–1876 John H Gladstone
1876–1878 George C Foster
1878–1880 William G Adams
1880–1882 The Lord Kelvin of Largs
1882–1884 Robert B Clifton
1884–1886 Frederick Guthrie
1886–1888 Balfour Stewart
1888–1890 Arnold W Reinold
1890–1892 William E Ayrton
1892–1893 George F Fitzgerald
1893–1895 Arthur W Rucker
1895–1897 William de W Abney
1897–1899 Shelford Bidwell
1899–1901 Oliver J Lodge
1901–1903 Silvanus P Thompson
1903–1905 Richard T Glazebrook
1905–1906 John H Poynting
1906–1908 John Perry
1908–1910 Charles Chree
1910–1912 Hugh Longbourne Callendar
1912–1914 Arthur Schuster
1914–1916 Sir Joseph J. Thomson
1916–1918 Charles V Boys
1918–1920 Charles Herbert Lees

Presidents of the Physical Society

1920–1922 Sir William Bragg
1922–1924 Alexander Russell
1924–1926 F E Smith
1926–1928 O W Richardson
1928–1930 W H Eccles
1930–1932 Sir Arthur Eddington
1932–1934 A O Rankine
1934–1936 Lord Rayleigh
1936–1938 T Smith
1938–1941 Sir Allan Ferguson
1941–1943 Sir Charles Darwin
1943–1945 E N de Costa Andrade
1945–1947 D Brunt
1947–1949 G I Finch
1949–1950 S Chapman
1950–1952 L F Bates
1952–1954 R Whiddington
1954–1956 H S W Massey
1956–1958 N F Mott
1958–1960 J A Ratcliffe

Presidents of the Institute of Physics

1919–1921 Sir Richard T Glazebrook
1921–1923 Sir Joseph Thomson
1923–1925 Sir Charles Parsons
1925–1927 Sir William Bragg
1927–1929 Sir Frank Dyson
1929–1931 William H Eccles
1931–1933 The Lord Rutherford of Nelson
1933–1935 Sir Henry Lyons
1935–1937 Alfred Fowler
1937–1939 Clifford C Paterson
1939–1943 Sir Lawrence Bragg
1943–1946 Sir Frank Smith
1946–1948 Arthur M Tyndall
1948–1950 Francis C Toy
1950–1952 William E Curtis
1952–1954 Charles Sykes
1954–1956 Sir John Cockroft
1956–1958 Oliver W Humphreys
1958–1960 Sir George Thomson

Presidents of the Institute of Physics and the Physical Society

1960–1962 Sir John Cockroft
1962–1964 Sir Alan Herries Wilson
1964–1966 Sir Gordon Sutherland
1966–1968 Sir James Taylor
1968–1970 Malcolm R Gavin

Presidents of the Institute of Physics

1970–1972 James W Menter
1972–1974 Sir Brian Flowers
1974–1976 Sir Brian Pippard
1976–1978 Basil J Mason
1978–1980 Rendel S Pease
1980–1982 Sir Denys Wilkinson
1982–1984 Sir Robert Clayton
1984–1986 Sir Alec Merrison
1986–1988 Godfrey H Stafford
1988–1990 Cyril Hilsum
1990–1992 Roger Blin-Stoyle
1992–1994 Clive A. P. Foxell
1994–1996 Sir Arnold Wolfendale
1996–1998 Brian Manley
1998–2000 Sir Gareth Roberts
2000–2002 Sir Peter Williams
2002–2004 Sir David Wallace
2004–2006 Sir John Enderby
2006–2008 Peter Saraga
2008–2010 Dame Jocelyn Bell Burnell
2010–2011 Marshall Stoneham
2011–2011 Dame Jocelyn Bell Burnell (Interim)
2011–2013 Sir Peter Knight
2013–2015 Frances Saunders
2015–2017 Roy Sambles
2017–2019 Dame Julia Higgins
2019–2021 Jonathan Flint
2021-Present Sheila Rowan

References

Institute of Physics
Lists of British people
Presidents of the Institute of Physics
Institute of Physics
Institute of Physics